Ichthyophis tricolor, the three-colored caecilian or Maddatorai caecilian, is an amphibian endemic to the Western Ghats, India. Its taxonomic status is unclear, including its relationship with Ichthyophis beddomei and the possibility of cryptic species.

Description
Its body is violet-brown, with a yellow lateral stripe from the lips to the tip of the tail, slightly wider and unbroken at the neck. A broad, white ventral stripe is present. Its snout is slightly projecting, the eyes are distinct, and the tentacles are placed closer to the eye at the edge of upper lip.

Habitat and conservation
Ichthyophis tricolor is a subterranean species associated with wet, semi-evergreen tropical forest, but also agricultural areas and rubber plantations. It occurs from near sea level up to  asl. It is an oviparous species with terrestrial eggs and aquatic larvae.

Ichthyophis tricolor is not uncommon in parts of its range. It is an adaptable species that occurs in several protected areas.

References

External links
 Image: Ichthyophis tricolor

tricolor
Amphibians of India
Endemic fauna of the Western Ghats
Taxa named by Nelson Annandale
Amphibians described in 1909